Gleb Brussenskiy (born 18 April 2000) is a Kazakh professional cyclist, who currently rides for UCI WorldTeam .

Major results

2017
 1st  Time trial, National Junior Road Championships
 6th Overall Tour de DMZ
2018
 1st  Combined team, Summer Youth Olympics
1st Road race
2nd Criterium
10th Cross-Country Short Circuit 
 1st  Overall Tour de DMZ
1st Stage 1
 2nd Time trial, National Junior Road Championships
2020
 10th Overall Turul României
2022
 1st  Road race, Asian Under-23 Road Championships

References

External links

 

2000 births
Living people
Kazakhstani male cyclists
Cyclists at the 2018 Summer Youth Olympics
Youth Olympic gold medalists for Kazakhstan
Sportspeople from Kokshetau
Kazakhstani people of Russian descent
21st-century Kazakhstani people